The Broads Authority is the agency which has statutory responsibility for the Broads in England. Originally, the Nature Conservancy Council (now Natural England), pressed for a special authority to manage the Broads which had been neglected for a long time. In 1978, the forerunner to the present-day Broads Authority was established by the Countryside Commission (now also Natural England). Ten years later, it had become clear that a statutory body was needed, and a special Act of Parliament, the Norfolk and Suffolk Broads Act 1988 (referred to as the Broads Act) made the Broads Authority into a special statutory authority which gave it parity yet establishing key differences with national park authorities.

Responsibilities
The Broads Authority has to:
conserve and enhance the natural beauty, wildlife and cultural heritage of the Broads
promote opportunities for the understanding and enjoyment of the special qualities of the Broads by the public
protect the interests of navigation (as navigation authority)
have regard for agriculture and forestry
have regard for the economic and social interests of those who live or work in the Broads.

Second act
In 2006 the Broads Authority promoted a second act, the primary purpose of which was to introduce greater safety controls on the broads and rivers. The Broads Authority Act 2009 received Royal Assent in July 2009.

Members
The Broads Authority is not democratically elected. Members are either co-opted from local authorities (to which they have been elected) or appointed by the Secretary of State for the Environment. The Broads Authority was formerly represented by one member on the East of England Regional Assembly, now defunct.

References

External links
 www.broads-authority.gov.uk
 www.visitthebroads.co.uk

The Broads
1978 establishments in England
Government agencies established in 1978
Waterways organisations in England
Governance of England